The Kokshetau Hills is a system of mountains of moderate altitude in the North Kazakhstan Region and Akmola Region, Kazakhstan.

The cities of Kokshetau, Shchuchinsk and Makinsk are located in ​​the hill zone, as well as the Burabay resort town.
The Burabay National Park and the Kokshetau National Park are the main protected areas.

Geography 
The Kokshetau Hills are a northern subsystem of the Kazakh Uplands (Saryarka), limited to the north by the West Siberian Plain. They are scattered across a vast area, with wide flat spaces in between of river valleys or lake basins. The individual hills and hill clusters rise abruptly from the plains of the intermontane basins. They are generally rocky or have rocky outcrops at the top and there are bizarre rock formations as well.

The Zhaksy-Zhalgyztau (highest point ), Imantau (highest point ) and Ayrtau (highest point ), are the main massifs in the western part, among other smaller and lower ones. The Zhilandi Massif (highest point ) and the Zerendin Mountains (highest point ), are located in the central part.  high Bukpa Hill rises above Kokshetau town and to the southeast rise the Makina Hills (highest point ).

Hydrography
Numerous rivers originate in the Kokshetau Hills flowing in different directions, such as the Kylshakty, Shagalaly, Iman-Burluk, Akan-Burluk, Zhilandi, Zhabai and Baksuk. Many are part of the Ishim basin. Also hundreds of lakes are located in the numerous tectonic basins of the hill area. The most well-known lakes are those part of the Kokshetau Lakes, a group that includes lakes Burabay, Ulken Shabakty, Kishi Shabakty, Kopa, Zerendi, Shalkar and Imantau.

Flora
The lower slopes of some of the hills are covered with sparse pine forest. Steppe vegetation, including grasses, Artemisia and Ephedra, grows on bare hillsides and in rock crevices. Shrubs are found on scree slopes.

See also
Geography of Kazakhstan

References

External links

Kokshetau National Park - kazakhstan.travel
Kazakh Uplands
North Kazakhstan Region

ru:Кокшетау (возвышенность)